Robert Love Taylor (December 20, 1899 – July 11, 1987) was a United States district judge of the United States District Court for the Eastern District of Tennessee.

Education and career

Born in Embreeville, Tennessee, Taylor was the son of longtime Tennessee politician Alfred A. Taylor, and was named for Alfred's brother, Robert Love Taylor, also very active in Tennessee politics. Taylor received a Bachelor of Philosophy degree from Milligan College in 1922 and read law to enter the bar in 1923, also receiving a Bachelor of Laws from Yale Law School in 1924. He was a semi-professional baseball player in Summers, Tennessee from 1920 to 1922. He was in private practice in Johnson City, Tennessee from 1924 to 1949.

Federal judicial service

On November 2, 1949, Taylor received a recess appointment from President Harry S. Truman to a seat on the United States District Court for the Eastern District of Tennessee vacated by Judge George Caldwell Taylor. Formally nominated to the same seat by President Truman on January 5, 1950, Taylor was confirmed by the United States Senate on March 8, 1950, and received his commission on March 9, 1950. He served as Chief Judge from 1961 to 1969. He was a member of the Judicial Conference of the United States from 1972 to 1975. He assumed senior status on January 15, 1984, serving in that capacity until his death on July 11, 1987.

References

Sources

External links 
 Robert L. Taylor Papers, University of Tennessee Knoxville Libraries

1899 births
1987 deaths
Milligan University alumni
Yale Law School alumni
Judges of the United States District Court for the Eastern District of Tennessee
United States district court judges appointed by Harry S. Truman
20th-century American judges
People from Washington County, Tennessee
United States federal judges admitted to the practice of law by reading law